Alma Lach (née Satorius, June 8, 1914 – October 21, 2013) was an American chef, cookbook author, and food consultant.

Biography
Alma Lach was born Alma Elizabeth Satorius on June 8, 1914 in Petersburg, Illinois. She began studying home economics at the University of Chicago in 1939, where she met her husband, historian Donald F. Lach.
 After her husband received a Fulbright Scholarship to study in Paris in 1949, Lach began attending Le Cordon Bleu cooking school. She received the Grand Diplôme from there in 1956. In the interim she published children's cook books, including A Child’s First Cook Book in 1950 and two that featured the Campbell's Kids.

Lach's first foray into mass media occurred in 1955, when she created and hosted the children's cooking show Let's Cook, which aired on WTTW in Chicago and later on WGN. From 1957 to 1964 she served as the food editor of the Chicago Sun-Times, where she published a column entitled Good Food.

Further endeavors included television appearances on Over Easy with Hugh Downs, the Lee Phillip Show on WBBM-TV, and various iterations of the Today show. Through her company, Alma Lach Kitchens, Inc., Lach worked as a consultant to various Chicago restaurants, including the Berghoff, and for Flying Food Fare, which provided meals to Midway Airlines. In the 1970s she opened the Alma Lach Cooking School on Rush Street in Chicago. In 1975 she was hired by Lettuce Entertain You founder Rich Melman as a consultant.

Lach died in Ann Arbor, Michigan on October 21, 2013 at age 99.

Honors and awards
As a result of receiving the Grand Diplôme from Le Cordon Bleu, Lach received membership in the Légion d’Honneur by the French government. She received a mink stole for first prize in the Pillsbury Creative Recipe Content for Newspaper and Magazine Food Editors for her work as food editor at the Chicago Sun-Times in 1958. In 1962 she was granted full membership in the Confrérie des Chevaliers du Tastevin, and in 1964 she became a member of the Confrérie de la Chaîne des Rôtisseurs.

Works

Books
 A Child’s First Cook Book (1950). .
 The Campbell Kids at Home (1954). .
 The Campbell Kids Have a Party (1954). .
 Let’s Cook (1956). 
 Cooking à la Cordon Bleu (1970). .
 Hows and Whys of French Cooking (1974). .

Television series
 Let’s Cook (1955).

References

External links 
 Alma Lach's Kitchen: Transforming Taste

Alumni of Le Cordon Bleu
American food writers
American television chefs
American women chefs
American cookbook writers
1914 births
2013 deaths
University of Chicago alumni
American gastronomes